The Machai Hydropower Plant is a run-of-the-river hydroelectric power plant with a generating capacity of 2.6 MW. Construction of the damn crossing the Machai Canal began in 2013 and was completed in March 2015 at the cost of PKR 683.50 million.

References 

Dams in Pakistan
Hydroelectric power stations in Pakistan